Preikapė ('place by graves', formerly) is a village in Kėdainiai district municipality, in Kaunas County, in central Lithuania. According to the 2011 census, the village had a population of 35 people. There is an ancient burial place. The southern part of the village is next to the Aluona river.

Demography

References

Villages in Kaunas County
Kėdainiai District Municipality